Sympistis wilsoni is a moth of the family Noctuidae first described by William Barnes and Foster Hendrickson Benjamin in 1924. It is found in the Canadian provinces of Alberta and British Columbia.

The wingspan is about 24 mm.

External links

wilsoni
Moths of North America
Moths described in 1924